Trigonodes lucasii is a moth of the family Noctuidae first described by Achille Guenée in 1852. It is found in the Caribbean, including the Dominican Republic, the Antilles and Jamaica.

References

External links
"Trigonodes lucasii". Moths of Jamaica. Retrieved January 25, 2020.

Catocalinae